Vujević is a South Slavic surname. Notable people with the surname include:

Branimir Vujević (born 1974), Croatian rower
Goran Vujević (born 1973), Montenegrin-born Serbian volleyball player
Pavle Vujević (1881–1966), Serbian geographer
Robert Vujević (born 1980), Croatian footballer

Croatian surnames
Serbian surnames